Vardo Rumessen (8 August 1942 – 24 August 2015) was an Estonian pianist, musicologist and politician for the Union of Pro Patria and Res Publica. He is best known for his work with Eduard Tubin's music. He was born in Pärnu.

Political activity
Rumessen's political activity centered on restoring Estonia's independence, and he was a member in the following organisations:
 1989: Estonian Citizens' Committees' Provisional Communications Department;
 1989–1995: Estonian National Independence Party;
 1990: Congress of Estonia;
 1992: ;
 From the year 1995 member of the Pro Patria Union;
 Throughout 1992–1995 and 1999–2003 member of Riigikogu.

References

External links
Official website www.vardorumessen.ee
Association of Estonian Professional Musicians

Estonian classical pianists
1942 births
2015 deaths
People from Pärnu
Members of the Riigikogu, 1992–1995
Members of the Riigikogu, 1999–2003
Recipients of the Order of the National Coat of Arms, 5th Class
Estonian National Independence Party politicians
Isamaa politicians
20th-century classical pianists
21st-century classical pianists
Estonian Academy of Music and Theatre alumni
20th-century Estonian musicians
21st-century Estonian musicians
20th-century Estonian politicians